John Paul (29 October 1950 – 23 April 2022) was an Indian scriptwriter, producer, author and actor who worked in Malayalam cinema. He is best known for his work in 1980s and early 1990s.

Early life
John Paul was born in Ernakulam as the only son of P.V. Paulose and Rebecca on 29 October 1950. After completing his BA and MA in Economics from Maharaja’s College he joined Canara Bank in 1972. In 1983, he resigned the job and fully focused on movies.

Career
As a scriptwriter he penned many films, most notably for Bharathan. 

The awards given to him include the National Award for Best Environmentalist, Film Critics Award For Script and Documentaries, State Television Award and a special jury award from International Federation of Film Critics. He was awarded State Award For The Best Film Book for M.T. Oru Anuyathra. He was the producer of the movie Oru Cherupunchiri directed by M.T. Vasudevan Nair, which has won state, national and international awards.

John Paul was the founder general secretary for MACTA, an association for film technicians. In 2017 he acted in film C/O Saira Banu along with Manju Warrier. He was also seen in prominent role in Gangster, opposite Mammootty. His anecdotal narrations of many actors and actresses in the Malayalam film industry were broadcast in Safari TV.

Personal life and death
John Paul was married to Aisha Elizabeth and had a daughter Jisha Jibi. He died in Kochi on 23 April 2022 at the age of 71.

Filmography

Awards
 Kerala State Film Award for Best Book on Cinema

References

External links 
 

1950 births
2022 deaths
Deaths from kidney disease
Malayalam screenwriters
Malayalam-language writers
Writers from Kerala
Place of birth missing
Indian male screenwriters
20th-century Indian screenwriters
20th-century Indian male writers
21st-century Indian screenwriters
21st-century Indian male writers